Break Free is a 2003 Italian romance-comedy drama film directed by Gianluca Maria Tavarelli.

For his performance in this film and in The Return of Cagliostro Luigi Maria Burruano received a special mention from the Pasinetti Award jury at the 2003 Venice Film Festival.

Plot 
The story tells of two boys from Abruzzo. Cenzo is iun man from Bussi sul Tirino, small mountain village, who moves to the big city of Pescara. But Cenzo doesn't get used to the city life, and falls into depression. The son Vince instead is a boy full of life, who dreams of escape from Pescara, and wants to learn about the world, and meets the traumatic Genny, a girl of Pescara too. Genny loves Vince, however she is a very sensitive girl who suffers from panic attacks.

Cast 

 Elio Germano: Vince
 Nicole Grimaudo: Genny
 Anita Zagaria: Paola 
 Luigi Maria Burruano: Cenzo
 Myriam Catania:Elena

See also  
 List of Italian films of 2003

References

External links

2003 films
Italian romantic comedy-drama films
2003 romantic comedy-drama films
2003 comedy films
2003 drama films
Films set in Pescara
Films shot in Pescara
2000s Italian-language films
2000s Italian films
Fandango (Italian company) films
Medusa Film films